Infante Fernando of Portugal (Fernando Maria Luís de Saxe-Coburgo-Gotha e Bragança; 23 July 1846 – 6 November 1861) was the fourth son of Queen Maria II of Portugal and King-consort Fernando II and a member of the House of Braganza.

Life 
Fernando was a lieutenant in the Fifth Battalion of Caçadores, and received the Grand Cross of the Order of Our Lady of the Conception of Vila Viçosa. With two of his brothers, King Pedro V and Infante João, Duke of Beja, Fernando died of typhoid fever or cholera in late 1861. He was buried in the Royal Pantheon of the Braganza Dynasty.

Ancestry

References

 Redacção Quidnovi, com coordenação de José Hermano Saraiva, História de Portugal, Dicionário de Personalidades, Volume XIV, Ed. QN-Edição e Conteúdos, S.A., 2004.
 Tavares Dias, Marina, D. Carlos, Lisboa 1908, Quimera Editores, Lda., 2007. 

1846 births
1861 deaths
House of Braganza-Saxe-Coburg and Gotha
Portuguese infantes
People from Lisbon
Deaths from cholera
Deaths from typhoid fever
Burials at the Monastery of São Vicente de Fora
Knights Grand Cross of the Order of the Immaculate Conception of Vila Viçosa
19th-century Portuguese people
Royalty and nobility who died as children
Sons of kings